The People’s University of Medical and Health Sciences for Women (PUMHSW) is a public medical university located in Shaheed Benazirabad District (Nawabshah), Sindh, Pakistan. 

It is the first women’s medical university in Sindh. The University is affiliated with People’s Medical University Hospital (formerly referred to as People’s Medical College Hospital or Civil Hospital, Nawabshah) and NORIN Cancer Hospital.

Academics 
Apart from MBBS offered by the University, undergraduate programs like DPT, PharmD, Bachelor of Nursing, BS Public Health are offered. Postgraduate courses in medicine, anaesthesiology, public health, and community medicine are also being offered since 2004. As a result, it received recognition from British Medical Association, ECFMG and other international bodies.

Research 
JPUMHS is the official research journal of the University which was started in 2011. It is a quarterly published, multi-disciplinary and peer-reviewed journal.

History 
As a result of dire need of women to pursue higher education, a medical college in Nawabshah, People’s Medical College, was established exclusively for women in 1974 by Zulfiqar Ali Bhutto, making it the first women’s medical college in the province. The college offered undergraduate medical course (MBBS) in its initial years and was affiliated with University of Sindh. It got affiliated with People’s Medical College Hospital in 1983. The medical college was initially located in the District Council (DC) High School (the oldest government high school in the city), consisting of an auditorium and a couple of hostels along with the main building of Muslim Boarding House. 

In 2004, postgraduate courses were introduced. A proposal of Health Department of Sindh to introduce co-education in the college was vehemently opposed by the Academic Council of the college in 2005. The name of the college was suddenly changed to Nawabshah Medical College by the provincial government in 2006, leading to uproar as its name was easily confused with Nishtar Medical College. In 2009, Sindh government upgraded the status of the medical college to a university through an act, and it was subsequently renamed as People’s University of Medical and Health Sciences for Women. 

The University was made the centralized Admitting University of the province by the provincial committee for admission to medicine and dentistry in 2020.

External links
 PUMHS official website

Larkana District
Public universities and colleges in Sindh
Women's universities and colleges in Pakistan

References